Joseph Michael Cole (born 28 November 1988) is an English actor from Kingston, London. Some of his most notable roles include: Luke in Skins, Tommy in Offender, John Shelby in Peaky Blinders, Marzin and Beckwith in Secret in Their Eyes, Reece in Green Room, Billy Moore in A Prayer Before Dawn, Frank in the Black Mirror episode "Hang the DJ", Sean Wallace in Gangs of London and Iver Iversen in Against the Ice.

Career
Cole's acting career began when he was accepted into the National Youth Theatre. He obtained his first roles in a one-night show in the West End, on The Bill and Holby City, and then in roles on stage at the Bush Theatre's sell-out School Season. Cole has also penned a comedy series with Matt Lucas. He starred as John Shelby in the British historical crime drama Peaky Blinders.
He also played a part in a season 4 episode of Charlie Brooker's Black Mirror, earning a BAFTA nomination for Best Actor.

For his role as Billy Moore in A Prayer Before Dawn, Cole won Best Actor at the 2018 British Independent Film Awards.

Personal life
Cole grew up in Kingston upon Thames in London, and attended Hollyfield Secondary School in Surbiton. The oldest of five boys, Cole's younger brother Finn Cole is also an actor and co-starred alongside him in Peaky Blinders.

Filmography

Film

Television

References

External links 

English male television actors
Year of birth uncertain
Living people
English male film actors
Male actors from London
People from Kingston upon Thames
21st-century English male actors
National Youth Theatre members
1988 births